The 1921–22 season was the 49th season of competitive football in Scotland and the 32nd season of the Scottish Football League. Division Two was reintroduced after having been abandoned due to World War I. Automatic promotion and relegation was introduced this season, as well as goal difference to divide teams who are level on points. Between next season and the 1974–75 season, goal average became the decider between teams equal on points.

Scottish League Division One

Champions: Celtic
Relegated: Dumbarton, Queen's Park, Clydebank

Scottish League Division Two

Promoted: Alloa Athletic

Scottish Cup

Morton were winners of the Scottish Cup after a 1–0 win over Rangers.

Other honours

National

County

Highland League

Junior Cup

St Roch's were winners of the Junior Cup after a 2–1 win over Kilwinning Rangers in the final replay.

Scotland national team

Scotland were winners of the 1922 British Home Championship.

Key:
 (H) = Home match
 (A) = Away match
 BHC = British Home Championship

See also
1921–22 Aberdeen F.C. season
Lord Provost's Rent Relief Cup

Notes and references

External links
Scottish Football Historical Archive

 
Seasons in Scottish football